is a Japanese actor and voice actor.

Voice actor roles

Anime
1995
 Juu Senshi Garukiba
 Linda Cube (Comer)
1996
 Linda Cube Again (Comer)
1998
 Heroine Dream 2 (Hibiki Narutani)
 Serial Experiments Lain (Voice)
 Radiant Silver Gun (Creator)
 If I See You in My Dreams (Whale)
2000
 Sakura Wars (Researcher)
2002
 Overman King Gainer (Kejinan Todd)
 Getbackers (Guard (ep 7))
2003
 Kino no Tabi: The Beautiful World (Man)
2004
 Mars Daybreak (Rim-eyes)
2005
 Kotenkotenko (White Rat)
 Blood+ (Forrest)
2006
 Blood+ Final Piece (Forrest)
 Pumpkin Scissors (Mariel's father)
2008
 Michiko & Hatchin (Nuno)
2010
 Another Century's Episode: R (Kejinan Dad)
2016
 My Hero Academia (Higari Maijima)
2019
 Fairy Tail (Wall Eehto)

Video Games
 Garou: Mark of the Wolves (Kevin Rian, Grant)
 Skylanders: Spyro's Adventure (Dino-Rang and Drill Sergeant)
 Super Robot Wars Z (Kejinan Todd)
 Tatsunoko Fight (Berg Katze)
 Brave Soul
 Linda Cube (George Comer)
 Radiant Silvergun (Creator)

Tokusatsu
 Kamen Rider Ghost (Denki Ganma)

Dubbing

Live-action
John Leguizamo
Collateral Damage (Felix Ramirez)
Land of the Dead (Cholo DeMora)
The Counselor (Randy)
Ride Along (Santiago)
Stealing Cars (Montgomery De La Cruz)
When They See Us (Raymond Santana Sr.)
Playing with Fire (Rodrigo Torres)
The Assassination of Jesse James by the Coward Robert Ford (Wood Hite (Jeremy Renner))
The Bounty Hunter (Bobby Jenkins (Dorian Missick))
The League of Extraordinary Gentlemen (Rodney Skinner (Tony Curran))

Animation
CatDog (Dog)
I Got a Rocket! (Rocket)

References

External links
 You Kitazawa

1963 births
Japanese male voice actors
Living people